Jean Girault (9 May 1924 – 24 July 1982) was a French film director and screenwriter. From 1951 to 1960 he worked as a screenwriter, mainly for comedy films. He made his film debut as a director in 1960. He directed more than thirty films between 1960 and 1982. In 1982, he died of tuberculosis at the age of 58.

Filmography
Director
 Les pique-assiette (1960)
 Les Moutons de Panurge (1960)
 Les Livreurs (1961)
 People in Luck (1963)
 Les Bricoleurs (1963)
 Pouic-Pouic (1963)
 Let's Rob the Bank (1964)
 The Troops of St. Tropez (1964)
 The Gorillas (1964)
 Gendarme in New York (1965)
 Monsieur le président-directeur général (1966)
 Les grandes vacances (1967)
 A Strange Kind of Colonel (1968)
 Le gendarme se marie (1968)
 La maison de campagne (1969)
 Le gendarme en balade (1970)
 Le Juge (1971)
 Jo (1971)
 Les charlots font l'Espagne (1972)
 Le concierge (1973)
 Le permis de conduire (1974)
 Deux grandes filles dans un pyjama (1974)
 Les murs ont des oreilles (1974)
 L'intrépide (1975)
 L'Année sainte (1976)
 Le mille-pattes fait des claquettes (1977)
 L'horoscope (1978)
 The Gendarme and the Extra-Terrestrials (1979)
 L'Avare (1980)
 Ach du lieber Harry (1981)
 La Soupe aux choux (1981)
 Le gendarme et les gendarmettes (1982)
Writer
 Un jour avec vous (1952)

References

External links

French film directors
French male screenwriters
20th-century French screenwriters
German-language film directors
1924 births
1982 deaths
20th-century deaths from tuberculosis
Tuberculosis deaths in France
20th-century French male writers